John Grace may refer to:

Politics
John Grace (British politician) (1886–1972), British Member of Parliament for Wirral 1924–1931
John P. Grace, mayor of Charleston, South Carolina, namesake of the John P. Grace Memorial Bridge
John W. Grace (1927–2009), first Privacy Commissioner of Canada
John Grace (Māori leader) (1905–1985), New Zealand interpreter, public servant, community leader and High Commissioner to Fiji

Sports
John Grace (Canadian football) (born 1977), Canadian Football League player
John Grace (Irish footballer) (born 1964), Irish footballer

Others
John Hilton Grace (1873–1958), British mathematician

See also